Sapp is a surname with multiple possible origins.

People

Allen Sapp (born 1929), Canadian Cree painter
Benny Sapp (born 1981) American football player
Bob Sapp (born 1973) American football player, also American mixed martial artist and kickboxer
Carolyn Suzanne Sapp (born 1967), American beauty queen
Cecil Sapp (born 1978) American football player
Gerome Sapp (born 1981) American football player
Marvin Sapp (floruit 1990s), American religious leader and musician
Theron Sapp (born 1935) American football player
Warren Sapp (born 1972) American football player
William Sapp (disambiguation)

References